The following is a partial list of the "C" codes for Medical Subject Headings (MeSH), as defined by the United States National Library of Medicine (NLM).

This list continues the information at List of MeSH codes (C14). Codes following these are found at List of MeSH codes (C16). For other MeSH codes, see List of MeSH codes.

The source for this content is the set of 2006 MeSH Trees from the NLM.

– hemic and lymphatic diseases

– hematologic diseases

– anemia
  – anemia, aplastic
  – anemia, hypoplastic, congenital
  – anemia, diamond-blackfan
  – fanconi anemia
  – anemia, hemolytic
  – anemia, hemolytic, autoimmune
  – anemia, hemolytic, congenital
  – anemia, dyserythropoietic, congenital
  – anemia, hemolytic, congenital nonspherocytic
  – anemia, sickle cell
  – hemoglobin sc disease
  – sickle cell trait
  – elliptocytosis, hereditary
  – glucosephosphate dehydrogenase deficiency
  – favism
  – hemoglobin c disease
  – spherocytosis, hereditary
  – thalassemia
  – alpha-thalassemia
  – beta-thalassemia
  – favism
  – hemoglobinuria
  – hemoglobinuria, paroxysmal
  – hemolytic-uremic syndrome
  – anemia, hypochromic
  – anemia, iron-deficiency
  – anemia, macrocytic
  – anemia, megaloblastic
  – anemia, pernicious
  – anemia, myelophthisic
  – anemia, neonatal
  – fetofetal transfusion
  – fetomaternal transfusion
  – anemia, refractory
  – anemia, refractory, with excess of blasts
  – anemia, sideroblastic
  – red-cell aplasia, pure
  – anemia, diamond-blackfan

– blood coagulation disorders
  – coagulation protein disorders
  – activated protein c resistance
  – afibrinogenemia
  – factor v deficiency
  – factor vii deficiency
  – factor x deficiency
  – factor xi deficiency
  – factor xii deficiency
  – factor xiii deficiency
  – hemophilia a
  – hemophilia b
  – hypoprothrombinemias
  – von willebrand disease
  – disseminated intravascular coagulation
  – blood coagulation disorders, inherited
  – activated protein c resistance
  – afibrinogenemia
  – antithrombin iii deficiency
  – bernard-soulier syndrome
  – factor v deficiency
  – factor vii deficiency
  – factor x deficiency
  – factor xi deficiency
  – factor xii deficiency
  – factor xiii deficiency
  – hemophilia a
  – hemophilia b
  – hermanski-pudlak syndrome
  – hypoprothrombinemias
  – protein c deficiency
  – thrombasthenia
  – von willebrand disease
  – wiskott-aldrich syndrome
  – platelet storage pool deficiency
  – hermanski-pudlak syndrome
  – protein s deficiency
  – purpura
  – purpura, hyperglobulinemic
  – purpura, schoenlein-henoch
  – purpura, thrombocytopenic
  – purpura, thrombocytopenic
  – purpura, thrombocytopenic, idiopathic
  – purpura, thrombotic thrombocytopenic
  – wiskott-aldrich syndrome
  – thrombocythemia, hemorrhagic
  – vitamin k deficiency
  – hemorrhagic disease of newborn

– blood group incompatibility
  – erythroblastosis, fetal
  – hydrops fetalis
  – kernicterus
  – rh isoimmunization

– blood platelet disorders
  – bernard-soulier syndrome
  – platelet storage pool deficiency
  – hermanski-pudlak syndrome
  – thrombasthenia
  – thrombocytopenia
  – hemolytic-uremic syndrome
  – purpura, thrombocytopenic
  – purpura, thrombocytopenic, idiopathic
  – purpura, thrombotic thrombocytopenic
  – wiskott-aldrich syndrome
  – thrombocytosis
  – thrombocythemia, hemorrhagic
  – von willebrand disease

– blood protein disorders
  – abetalipoproteinemia
  – agammaglobulinemia
  – antithrombin iii deficiency
  – dysgammaglobulinemia
  – iga deficiency
  – igg deficiency
  – hypergammaglobulinemia
  – monoclonal gammopathies, benign
  – hypoproteinemia
  – hypoalbuminemia
  – paraproteinemias
  – cryoglobulinemia
  – heavy chain disease
  – immunoproliferative small intestinal disease
  – multiple myeloma
  – poems syndrome
  – waldenstrom macroglobulinemia
  – protein c deficiency
  – protein s deficiency

– bone marrow diseases
  – anemia, aplastic
  – anemia, hypoplastic, congenital
  – anemia, diamond-blackfan
  – fanconi anemia
  – bone marrow neoplasms
  – myelodysplastic syndromes
  – anemia, refractory
  – anemia, refractory, with excess of blasts
  – anemia, sideroblastic
  – hemoglobinuria, paroxysmal
  – leukemia, myeloid
  – myeloproliferative disorders
  – anemia, myelophthisic
  – leukemia, erythroblastic, acute
  – leukemoid reaction
  – myelofibrosis
  – myeloid metaplasia
  – polycythemia vera
  – thrombocytosis
  – thrombocythemia, hemorrhagic

– hematologic neoplasms
  – bone marrow neoplasms

– hemoglobinopathies
  – anemia, sickle cell
  – hemoglobin sc disease
  – sickle cell trait
  – hemoglobin c disease
  – thalassemia
  – alpha-thalassemia
  – hydrops fetalis
  – beta-thalassemia

– hemorrhagic disorders
  – afibrinogenemia
  – bernard-soulier syndrome
  – disseminated intravascular coagulation
  – factor v deficiency
  – factor vii deficiency
  – factor x deficiency
  – factor xi deficiency
  – factor xii deficiency
  – factor xiii deficiency
  – hemophilia a
  – hemophilia b
  – hypoprothrombinemias
  – platelet storage pool deficiency
  – hermanski-pudlak syndrome
  – purpura, thrombocytopenic, idiopathic
  – thrombasthenia
  – thrombocythemia, hemorrhagic
  – vascular hemostatic disorders
  – cryoglobulinemia
  – ehlers-danlos syndrome
  – hemangioma, cavernous
  – hemangioma, cavernous, central nervous system
  – multiple myeloma
  – pseudoxanthoma elasticum
  – purpura, hyperglobulinemic
  – purpura, schoenlein-henoch
  – scurvy
  – shwartzman phenomenon
  – telangiectasia, hereditary hemorrhagic
  – waldenstrom macroglobulinemia
  – vitamin k deficiency
  – hemorrhagic disease of newborn
  – von willebrand disease
  – waterhouse-friderichsen syndrome
  – wiskott-aldrich syndrome

– leukocyte disorders
  – eosinophilia
  – angiolymphoid hyperplasia with eosinophilia
  – eosinophilia-myalgia syndrome
  – eosinophilic granuloma
  – hypereosinophilic syndrome
  – pulmonary eosinophilia
  – infectious mononucleosis
  – leukocytosis
  – leukemoid reaction
  – lymphocytosis
  – leukopenia
  – agranulocytosis
  – neutropenia
  – lymphopenia
  – t-lymphocytopenia, idiopathic cd4-positive
  – leukostasis
  – pelger-huet anomaly
  – phagocyte bactericidal dysfunction
  – chediak-higashi syndrome
  – granulomatous disease, chronic
  – job's syndrome

– methemoglobinemia

– pancytopenia

– polycythemia

– pregnancy complications, hematologic

– preleukemia

– sulfhemoglobinemia

– thrombophilia
  – activated protein c resistance
  – antithrombin iii deficiency
  – disseminated intravascular coagulation
  – protein c deficiency
  – protein s deficiency
  – purpura, thrombotic thrombocytopenic

– lymphatic diseases

– lymphadenitis
  – cat-scratch disease
  – histiocytic necrotizing lymphadenitis
  – mesenteric lymphadenitis
  – tuberculosis, lymph node

– lymphangiectasis
  – lymphangiectasis, intestinal

– lymphangitis

– lymphatic abnormalities
  – lymphangiectasis, intestinal

– lymphedema
  – elephantiasis
  – elephantiasis, filarial

– lymphocele

– lymphoproliferative disorders
  – agammaglobulinemia
  – giant lymph node hyperplasia
  – granuloma
  – angiolymphoid hyperplasia with eosinophilia
  – Churg–Strauss syndrome
  – heavy chain disease
  – immunoproliferative small intestinal disease
  – immunoblastic lymphadenopathy
  – infectious mononucleosis
  – leukemia, hairy cell
  – leukemia, lymphocytic
  – leukemia, myeloid
  – leukemia, nonlymphocytic, acute
  – leukemia, myelocytic, acute
  – lymphangiomyoma
  – lymphangioleiomyomatosis
  – lymphoma
  – hodgkin disease
  – lymphoma, non-hodgkin
  – lymphoma, b-cell
  – burkitt lymphoma
  – lymphoma, aids-related
  – lymphoma, mucosa-associated lymphoid tissue
  – lymphoma, small-cell
  – lymphoma, diffuse
  – lymphoma, large-cell, diffuse
  – lymphoma, large-cell, immunoblastic
  – lymphoma, lymphoblastic
  – lymphoma, mixed-cell, diffuse
  – lymphoma, small cleaved-cell, diffuse
  – lymphoma, mantle-cell
  – lymphoma, small lymphocytic
  – lymphoma, small noncleaved-cell
  – lymphoma, follicular
  – lymphoma, large-cell, follicular
  – lymphoma, mixed-cell, follicular
  – lymphoma, small cleaved-cell, follicular
  – lymphoma, high-grade
  – lymphoma, large-cell, immunoblastic
  – lymphoma, lymphoblastic
  – lymphoma, small noncleaved-cell
  – burkitt lymphoma
  – lymphoma, intermediate-grade
  – lymphoma, large-cell, diffuse
  – lymphoma, large-cell, follicular
  – lymphoma, mixed-cell, diffuse
  – lymphoma, small cleaved-cell, diffuse
  – lymphoma, mantle-cell
  – lymphoma, large-cell
  – lymphoma, large-cell, diffuse
  – lymphoma, large-cell, follicular
  – lymphoma, large-cell, immunoblastic
  – lymphoma, large-cell, ki-1
  – lymphoma, lymphoblastic
  – lymphoma, low-grade
  – lymphoma, mixed-cell, follicular
  – lymphoma, mucosa-associated lymphoid tissue
  – lymphoma, small cleaved-cell, follicular
  – lymphoma, small lymphocytic
  – lymphoma, mixed-cell
  – lymphoma, mixed-cell, diffuse
  – lymphoma, mixed-cell, follicular
  – lymphoma, small-cell
  – lymphoma, small cleaved-cell, diffuse
  – lymphoma, mantle-cell
  – lymphoma, small cleaved-cell, follicular
  – lymphoma, small lymphocytic
  – lymphoma, small noncleaved-cell
  – lymphoma, t-cell
  – lymphoma, lymphoblastic
  – lymphoma, t-cell, cutaneous
  – lymphoma, large-cell, ki-1
  – mycosis fungoides
  – sezary syndrome
  – lymphoma, t-cell, peripheral
  – lymphoma, undifferentiated
  – lymphoma, large-cell, diffuse
  – lymphoma, small noncleaved-cell
  – burkitt lymphoma
  – lymphomatoid granulomatosis
  – marek disease
  – sarcoidosis
  – sarcoidosis, pulmonary
  – uveoparotid fever
  – sezary syndrome
  – tumor lysis syndrome
  – waldenstrom macroglobulinemia

– mucocutaneous lymph node syndrome

– pseudolymphoma

– reticuloendotheliosis
  – gaucher disease
  – histiocytosis
  – histiocytic disorders, malignant
  – histiocytosis, malignant
  – leukemia, monocytic, acute
  – lymphoma, large-cell
  – lymphoma, large-cell, ki-1
  – histiocytosis, langerhans-cell
  – eosinophilic granuloma
  – histiocytosis, non-langerhans-cell
  – erdheim-chester disease
  – histiocytosis, sinus
  – lymphohistiocytosis, hemophagocytic
  – niemann-pick diseases
  – sea-blue histiocyte syndrome
  – xanthogranuloma, juvenile
  – mast-cell sarcoma

– splenic diseases
  – hypersplenism
  – myeloid metaplasia
  – splenic infarction
  – splenic neoplasms
  – splenic rupture
  – splenosis
  – tuberculosis, splenic
  – wandering spleen

– thymus hyperplasia

– thymus neoplasms

– tuberculosis, lymph node
  – king's evil

The list continues at List of MeSH codes (C16).

C15